Mångha is the Avestan for "Moon, month",  equivalent to Persian Māh (Old Persian  ).
It is the name of the lunar deity in Zoroastrianism. The Iranian word is masculine. Although Mah is not a prominent deity in the Avestan scripture, his crescent was an important symbol of royalty throughout the  Parthian and Sassanid periods.

The Iranian word is cognate with the English moon, from PIE *mēns

Avesta

Although there are two Avestan hymns dedicated to the Moon, he is not a prominent divinity. 
In both the third Nyaish as well as in the seventh Yasht, the 'moon' more commonly spoken of is the physical moon. In these hymns, the phases of the moon are described at length. Ahura Mazda is described to be the cause of the moon's waxing and waning, and the Amesha Spentas evenly distribute the light of the moon over the earth. The Fravashis are said to be responsible for keeping the moon and stars on its appointed course. The sun, moon, and stars revolve around the peak of Hara Berezaiti.

The Moon is however also "bestower, radiant, glorious, possessed of water, possessed of warmth, possessed of knowledge, wealth, riches, discernment, weal, verdure, good, and the healing one". "During the spring, the Moon causes plants to grow up out of the earth".

This is an allusion to a cosmological drama that is however only properly attested in the texts of Zoroastrian tradition (see below).

In tradition

Herodotus states that the moon was the tutelary divinity of the Iranian expatriates residing in Asia Minor. 
The divinity Mah appears together with Mithra on Kushan coins.

In the Zoroastrian calendar, the twelfth day of the month is dedicated to and is under the protection of the Moon.

The Moon plays a prominent role in Zoroastrian cosmogony, in particular as described in detail in the  Bundahishn, a text finished in the 12th century. The legend runs as follows: Ahriman (Av: Angra Mainyu) incites Jeh (Jahi) the primeval whore to kill the primordial bovine Gawiewdad (Av. Gavaevodata). Jeh does as told, but as the creature lies dying, the chihr is rescued and placed in the care of the moon. This chihr is then the "prototype" (karb) of all creatures of the animal world.

In the hierarchy of yazatas, the Moon is the assistant (or 'cooperator', hamkar) of Vohu Manah (MP: Bahman), the Amesha Spenta of animal welfare, in particular of cattle. The identification with Vohu Manah - the hypostasis of "Good Purpose" or "Good Mind" - is reflected in other texts where the moon is associated with mental harmony and inner peace.

See also
Men (deity)

Footnotes

References

 
 

Yazatas
Lunar gods